The 1925 Green Bay Packers season was their seventh season overall and their fifth season in the National Football League. The team finished with an 8–5 record under player/coach Curly Lambeau earning them a ninth-place finish.  The season marked the first year the Packers played at City Stadium.

Schedule

 Game in italics is against a non-NFL team.

Standings

References
 Sportsencyclopedia.com

Green Bay Packers seasons
Green Bay Packers
Green Bay Packers